Jack McLeod is a New Zealand rugby league footballer who represented New Zealand.

Playing career
McLeod played for Taranaki and Auckland. He transferred from Taranaki in 1937 and joined the Richmond Rovers club. While there McLeod was selected for the New Zealand national rugby league team in 1937, playing against Australia. He toured Australia with New Zealand in 1938 however no test matches were played on the tour.

Four days after the 1937 test, McLeod was part of the New Zealand Māori side that defeated Australia 16-5.

Legacy
In 2008 he was named in the Taranaki Rugby League Team of the Century.

References

New Zealand rugby league players
New Zealand Māori rugby league players
New Zealand Māori rugby league team players
New Zealand national rugby league team players
Taranaki rugby league team players
Richmond Bulldogs players
Auckland rugby league team players
Rugby league second-rows
Rugby league locks
Manukau Magpies players
Living people
Year of birth missing (living people)